The Kaunas International Marathon is an annual international road marathon event, held in Kaunas, Lithuania. Race offers marathon, half marathon.

The first edition of the Kaunas Marathon was held in 2013.

References

Marathons in Lithuania
Sport in Kaunas
Recurring sporting events established in 2013
Half marathons
2013 establishments in Lithuania
Spring events in Lithuania